A gravitational lens is a distribution of matter (such as a cluster of galaxies) between a distant light source and an observer that is capable of bending the light from the source as the light travels toward the observer. This effect is known as gravitational lensing, and the amount of bending is one of the predictions of Albert Einstein's general theory of relativity. Treating light as corpuscles travelling at the speed of light, Newtonian physics also predicts the bending of light, but only half of that predicted by general relativity.

Although Einstein made unpublished calculations on the subject in 1912, Orest Khvolson (1924) and Frantisek Link (1936) are generally credited with being the first to discuss the effect in print. However, this effect is more commonly associated with Einstein, who published an article on the subject in 1936.

Fritz Zwicky posited in 1937 that the effect could allow galaxy clusters to act as gravitational lenses. It was not until 1979 that this effect was confirmed by observation of the Twin QSO SBS 0957+561.

Description

Unlike an optical lens, a point-like gravitational lens produces a maximum deflection of light that passes closest to its center, and a minimum deflection of light that travels furthest from its center. Consequently, a gravitational lens has no single focal point, but a focal line.  The term "lens" in the context of gravitational light deflection was first used by O.J. Lodge, who remarked that it is "not permissible to say that the solar gravitational field acts like a lens, for it has no focal length". If the (light) source, the massive lensing object, and the observer lie in a straight line, the original light source will appear as a ring around the massive lensing object (provided the lens has circular symmetry). If there is any misalignment, the observer will see an arc segment instead. 

This phenomenon was first mentioned in 1924 by the St. Petersburg physicist Orest Khvolson, and quantified by Albert Einstein in 1936. It is usually referred to in the literature as an Einstein ring, since Khvolson did not concern himself with the flux or radius of the ring image. More commonly, where the lensing mass is complex (such as a galaxy group or cluster) and does not cause a spherical distortion of spacetime, the source will resemble partial arcs scattered around the lens. The observer may then see multiple distorted images of the same source; the number and shape of these depending upon the relative positions of the source, lens, and observer, and the shape of the gravitational well of the lensing object.

There are three classes of gravitational lensing:

 Strong lensing Where there are easily visible distortions such as the formation of Einstein rings, arcs, and multiple images. Despite being considered "strong", the effect is in general relatively small, such that even a galaxy with a mass more than 100 billion times that of the Sun will produce multiple images separated by only a few arcseconds. Galaxy clusters can produce separations of several arcminutes. In both cases the galaxies and sources are quite distant, many hundreds of megaparsecs away from our Galaxy.
 Weak lensing Where the distortions of background sources are much smaller and can only be detected by analyzing large numbers of sources in a statistical way to find coherent distortions of only a few percent. The lensing shows up statistically as a preferred stretching of the background objects perpendicular to the direction to the centre of the lens. By measuring the shapes and orientations of large numbers of distant galaxies, their orientations can be averaged to measure the shear of the lensing field in any region. This, in turn, can be used to reconstruct the mass distribution in the area: in particular, the background distribution of dark matter can be reconstructed. Since galaxies are intrinsically elliptical and the weak gravitational lensing signal is small, a very large number of galaxies must be used in these surveys. These weak lensing surveys must carefully avoid a number of important sources of systematic error: the intrinsic shape of galaxies, the tendency of a camera's point spread function to distort the shape of a galaxy and the tendency of atmospheric seeing to distort images must be understood and carefully accounted for. The results of these surveys are important for cosmological parameter estimation, to better understand and improve upon the Lambda-CDM model, and to provide a consistency check on other cosmological observations. They may also provide an important future constraint on dark energy.
 Microlensing Where no distortion in shape can be seen but the amount of light received from a background object changes in time. The lensing object may be stars in the Milky Way in one typical case, with the background source being stars in a remote galaxy, or, in another case, an even more distant quasar. In extreme cases, a star in a distant galaxy can act as a microlens and magnify another star much farther away. The first example of this was the star MACS J1149 Lensed Star 1 (also known as Icarus), thanks to the boost in flux due to the microlensing effect. 

Gravitational lenses act equally on all kinds of electromagnetic radiation, not just visible light, and also in non-electromagnetic radiation, like gravitational waves. Weak lensing effects are being studied for the cosmic microwave background as well as galaxy surveys. Strong lenses have been observed in radio and x-ray regimes as well. If a strong lens produces multiple images, there will be a relative time delay between two paths: that is, in one image the lensed object will be observed before the other image.

History

Henry Cavendish in 1784 (in an unpublished manuscript) and Johann Georg von Soldner in 1801 (published in 1804) had pointed out that Newtonian gravity predicts that starlight will bend around a massive object as had already been supposed by Isaac Newton in 1704 in his Queries No.1 in his book Opticks. The same value as Soldner's was calculated by Einstein in 1911 based on the equivalence principle alone. However, Einstein noted in 1915, in the process of completing general relativity, that his (and thus Soldner's) 1911-result is only half of the correct value. Einstein became the first to calculate the correct value for light bending.

The first observation of light deflection was performed by noting the change in position of stars as they passed near the Sun on the celestial sphere. The observations were performed in 1919 by Arthur Eddington, Frank Watson Dyson, and their collaborators during the total solar eclipse on May 29. The solar eclipse allowed the stars near the Sun to be observed. Observations were made simultaneously in the cities of Sobral, Ceará, Brazil and in São Tomé and Príncipe on the west coast of Africa. The observations demonstrated that the light from stars passing close to the Sun was slightly bent, so that stars appeared slightly out of position.

The result was considered spectacular news and made the front page of most major newspapers. It made Einstein and his theory of general relativity world-famous. When asked by his assistant what his reaction would have been if general relativity had not been confirmed by Eddington and Dyson in 1919, Einstein said "Then I would feel sorry for the dear Lord. The theory is correct anyway." In 1912, Einstein had speculated that an observer could see multiple images of a single light source, if the light were deflected around a mass.  This effect would make the mass act as a kind of gravitational lens. However, as he only considered the effect of deflection around a single star, he seemed to conclude that the phenomenon was unlikely to be observed for the foreseeable future since the necessary alignments between stars and observer would be highly improbable. Several other physicists speculated about gravitational lensing as well, but all reached the same conclusion that it would be nearly impossible to observe.

Although Einstein made unpublished calculations on the subject, the first discussion of the gravitational lens in print was by Khvolson, in a short article discussing the "halo effect" of gravitation when the source, lens, and observer are in near-perfect alignment, now referred to as the Einstein ring.

In 1936, after some urging by Rudi W. Mandl, Einstein reluctantly published the short article "Lens-Like Action of a Star By the Deviation of Light In the Gravitational Field" in the journal Science.

In 1937, Fritz Zwicky first considered the case where the newly discovered galaxies (which were called 'nebulae' at the time) could act as both source and lens, and that, because of the mass and sizes involved, the effect was much more likely to be observed.

In 1963 Yu. G. Klimov, S. Liebes, and Sjur Refsdal recognized independently that quasars are an ideal light source for the gravitational lens effect.

It was not until 1979 that the first gravitational lens would be discovered. It became known as the "Twin QSO" since it initially looked like two identical quasistellar objects. (It is officially named SBS 0957+561.) This gravitational lens was discovered by Dennis Walsh, Bob Carswell, and Ray Weymann using the Kitt Peak National Observatory 2.1 meter telescope.

In the 1980s, astronomers realized that the combination of CCD imagers and computers would allow the brightness of millions of stars to be measured each night. In a dense field, such as the galactic center or the Magellanic clouds, many microlensing events per year could potentially be found. This led to efforts such as Optical Gravitational Lensing Experiment, or OGLE, that have characterized hundreds of such events, including those of OGLE-2016-BLG-1190Lb and OGLE-2016-BLG-1195Lb.

Explanation in terms of spacetime curvature

In general relativity, light follows the curvature of spacetime, hence when light passes around a massive object, it is bent. This means that the light from an object on the other side will be bent towards an observer's eye, just like an ordinary lens. In general relativity the speed of light depends on the gravitational potential (i.e. the metric) and this bending can be viewed as a consequence of the light traveling along a gradient in light speed. Light rays are the boundary between the future, the spacelike, and the past regions. The gravitational attraction can be viewed as the motion of undisturbed objects in a background curved geometry or alternatively as the response of objects to a force in a flat geometry. The angle of deflection is:

toward the mass M at a distance r from the affected radiation, where G is the universal constant of gravitation and c is the speed of light in vacuum.

Search for gravitational lenses

Most of the gravitational lenses in the past have been discovered accidentally. A search for gravitational lenses in the northern hemisphere (Cosmic Lens All Sky Survey, CLASS), done in radio frequencies using the Very Large Array (VLA) in New Mexico, led to the discovery of 22 new lensing systems, a major milestone. This has opened a whole new avenue for research ranging from finding very distant objects to finding values for cosmological parameters so we can understand the universe better.

A similar search in the southern hemisphere would be a very good step towards complementing the northern hemisphere search as well as obtaining other objectives for study. If such a search is done using well-calibrated and well-parameterized instrument and data, a result similar to the northern survey can be expected. The use of the Australia Telescope 20 GHz (AT20G) Survey data collected using the Australia Telescope Compact Array (ATCA) stands to be such a collection of data. As the data were collected using the same instrument maintaining a very stringent quality of data we should expect to obtain good results from the search. The AT20G survey is a blind survey at 20 GHz frequency in the radio domain of the electromagnetic spectrum. Due to the high frequency used, the chances of finding gravitational lenses increases as the relative number of compact core objects (e.g. quasars) are higher (Sadler et al. 2006). This is important as the lensing is easier to detect and identify in simple objects compared to objects with complexity in them. This search involves the use of interferometric methods to identify candidates and follow them up at higher resolution to identify them. Full detail of the project is currently under works for publication.

Microlensing techniques have been used to search for planets outside our solar system.  A statistical analysis of specific cases of observed microlensing over the time period of 2002 to 2007 found that most stars in the Milky Way galaxy hosted at least one orbiting planet within 0.5 to 10 AUs.

In 2009, weak gravitational lensing was used to extend the mass-X-ray-luminosity relation to older and smaller structures than was previously possible to improve measurements of distant galaxies.

 the most distant gravitational lens galaxy, J1000+0221, had been found using NASA’s Hubble Space Telescope.  While it remains the most distant quad-image lensing galaxy known, an even more distant two-image lensing galaxy was subsequently discovered by an international team of astronomers using a combination of Hubble Space Telescope and Keck telescope imaging and spectroscopy.  The discovery and analysis of the IRC 0218 lens was published in the Astrophysical Journal Letters on June 23, 2014.

Research published Sep 30, 2013 in the online edition of Physical Review Letters, led by McGill University in Montreal, Québec, Canada, has discovered the B-modes, that are formed due to gravitational lensing effect, using National Science Foundation's South Pole Telescope and with help from the Herschel space observatory. This discovery would open the possibilities of testing the theories of how our universe originated.

Solar gravitational lens

Albert Einstein predicted in 1936 that rays of light from the same direction that skirt the edges of the Sun would converge to a focal point approximately 542 AUs from the Sun. Thus, a probe positioned at this distance (or greater) from the Sun could use the Sun as a gravitational lens for magnifying distant objects on the opposite side of the Sun. A probe's location could shift around as needed to select different targets relative to the Sun.

This distance is far beyond the progress and equipment capabilities of space probes such as Voyager 1, and beyond the known planets and dwarf planets, though over thousands of years 90377 Sedna will move farther away on its highly elliptical orbit.  The high gain for potentially detecting signals through this lens, such as microwaves at the 21-cm hydrogen line, led to the suggestion by Frank Drake in the early days of SETI that a probe could be sent to this distance.  A multipurpose probe SETISAIL and later FOCAL was proposed to the ESA in 1993, but is expected to be a difficult task.  If a probe does pass 542 AU, magnification capabilities of the lens will continue to act at farther distances, as the rays that come to a focus at larger distances pass further away from the distortions of the Sun's corona. A critique of the concept was given by Landis, who discussed issues including interference of the solar corona, the high magnification of the target, which will make the design of the mission focal plane difficult, and an analysis of the inherent spherical aberration of the lens.

In 2020, NASA physicist Slava Turyshev presented his idea of Direct Multipixel Imaging and Spectroscopy of an Exoplanet with a Solar Gravitational Lens Mission. The lens could reconstruct the exoplanet image with ~25 km-scale surface resolution, enough to see surface features and signs of habitability.

Measuring weak lensing

Kaiser, Squires and Broadhurst (1995), Luppino & Kaiser (1997) and Hoekstra et al. (1998) prescribed a method to invert the effects of the point spread function (PSF) smearing and shearing, recovering a shear estimator uncontaminated by the systematic distortion of the PSF. This method (KSB+) is the most widely used method in weak lensing shear measurements.
 
Galaxies have random rotations and inclinations. As a result, the shear effects in weak lensing need to be determined by statistically preferred orientations. The primary source of error in lensing measurement is due to the convolution of the PSF with the lensed image. The KSB method measures the ellipticity of a galaxy image. The shear is proportional to the ellipticity. The objects in lensed images are parameterized according to their weighted quadrupole moments. For a perfect ellipse, the weighted quadrupole moments are related to the weighted ellipticity. KSB calculate how a weighted ellipticity measure is related to the shear and use the same formalism to remove the effects of the PSF.

KSB's primary advantages are its mathematical ease and relatively simple implementation. However, KSB is based on a key assumption that the PSF is circular with an anisotropic distortion. This is a reasonable assumption for cosmic shear surveys, but the next generation of surveys (e.g. LSST) may need much better accuracy than KSB can provide.

Gallery

See also
 Terrestrial atmospheric lens
 Galactic lens
 Gravitational lensing formalism
 Strong gravitational lensing
 Einstein cross
 Einstein ring
 Weak gravitational lensing
 Gravitational microlensing
 SN Refsdal
 Euclid (spacecraft), to measure gravitational lensing

Historical papers and references

References
Notes

Bibliography
 "Accidental Astrophysicists ". Science News, June 13, 2008.
 "XFGLenses". A Computer Program to visualize Gravitational Lenses, Francisco Frutos-Alfaro
 "G-LenS". A Point Mass Gravitational Lens Simulation, Mark Boughen.
 Newbury, Pete, "Gravitational Lensing". Institute of Applied Mathematics, The University of British Columbia.
 Cohen, N., "Gravity's Lens: Views of the New Cosmology", Wiley and Sons, 1988.
 "Q0957+561 Gravitational Lens". Harvard.edu.
 Bridges, Andrew, "Most distant known object in universe discovered". Associated Press. February 15, 2004. (Farthest galaxy found by gravitational lensing, using Abell 2218 and Hubble Space Telescope.)
 Analyzing Corporations ... and the Cosmos An unusual career path in gravitational lensing.
 "HST images of strong gravitational lenses". Harvard-Smithsonian Center for Astrophysics.
 "A planetary microlensing event" and "A Jovian-mass Planet in Microlensing Event OGLE-2005-BLG-071", the first extra-solar planet detections using microlensing.
 Gravitational lensing on arxiv.org
 NRAO CLASS home page
 AT20G survey
 A diffraction limit on the gravitational lens effect (Bontz, R. J. and Haugan, M. P. "Astrophysics and Space Science" vol. 78, no. 1, p. 199-210. August 1981)

Further reading
 
 
 .
 
 Tools for the evaluation of the possibilities of using parallax measurements of gravitationally lensed sources (Stein Vidar Hagfors Haugan. June 2008)

External links

 Video: Evalyn Gates – Einstein's Telescope: The Search for Dark Matter and Dark Energy in the Universe , presentation in Portland, Oregon, on April 19, 2009, from the author's recent book tour.
 Audio: Fraser Cain and Dr. Pamela Gay – Astronomy Cast: Gravitational Lensing, May 2007

Astrophysics
Effects of gravitation
 
Large-scale structure of the cosmos
Concepts in astronomy
Articles containing video clips